Datu Amir Kahar Tun Haji Mustapha, 70 was the State  Assemblymen for Banggi, Sabah for  22 years. He is the son of Tun Datu Haji Mustapha Datu Haji Harun, the “Father of Sabah  Independence” who was the former Chief Minister of Sabah and the former Governor of Sabah.

He was the former Deputy Chief Minister of Sabah and a Minister of Agriculture from  1993 to 1994. Datuk Amir was the Member of Parliament of Kota Marudu and Kudat from 1990 to 2004. Presently he is the Inspector General of  Project Sabah with  ministerial status at the Chief Minister Office Sabah. He was formerly the president United Sabah National Organization from 1992 to 1994. Currently Datuk Amir Kahar is the founder and president of Sabah And Palawan Cooperation Chamber Of Commerce And Industry.

He holds Diploma of Business Studies from London School of Business and a holder of  Harvard School of Business Advance Certificate in  Entrepreneurship.

Election results

References

Living people
Year of birth missing (living people)
Sabah politicians